Mike Prokopec (born May 17, 1974) is a Canadian former professional ice hockey forward.

Biography
Prokopec was born in Toronto, Ontario, Canada. As a youth, he played in the 1988 Quebec International Pee-Wee Hockey Tournament with a minor ice hockey team from Barrie, Ontario. He later played 15 games in the National Hockey League for the Chicago Blackhawks.

Career statistics

References

External links
 

1974 births
Living people
Canadian ice hockey forwards
Chicago Blackhawks draft picks
Chicago Blackhawks players
Cornwall Royals (OHL) players
Guelph Storm players
Manitoba Moose (IHL) players
Newmarket Royals players
Ice hockey people from Toronto
Barrie Colts players
Indianapolis Ice players
Worcester IceCats players
Detroit Vipers players